1600 Penn is an American television sitcom about a dysfunctional family living in the White House. The series stars Jenna Elfman, Bill Pullman, and Josh Gad. Gad, along with Jason Winer and Jon Lovett jointly created the central characters (the Gilchrist family) and the sitcom core format. NBC placed a series order in May 2012. The series aired as a mid-season replacement from December 17, 2012, to March 28, 2013. On May 9, 2013, NBC canceled the series after one season.

Characters
 Standrich "Skip" Gilchrist Jr. (Josh Gad) is the President of the United States' eldest son.
 Emily Nash-Gilchrist (Jenna Elfman) is the President's second wife and former campaign manager.
 Becca Gilchrist (Martha MacIsaac) is the President's eldest daughter.
 Marshall Malloy (Andre Holland) is the White House Press Secretary.
 Marigold Gilchrist (Amara Miller) is the President's younger daughter.
 Xander Gilchrist (Benjamin Stockham) is the President's younger son.
 Standrich Dale Gilchrist (Bill Pullman) is the President of the United States. A widower, he is a former United States Marine, Congressman, and Governor of Nevada.

Recurring character D.B. (Robbie Amell) was the presumed father to Becca's baby.

Production

Casting
Brittany Snow had originally been cast as the eldest daughter Becca, but was replaced by MacIsaac. This is the second time Bill Pullman has played an American president, the first having been in the film Independence Day.

Reception
1600 Penn received mixed reviews from critics. Rotten Tomatoes gives the series a rating of 43%, based on 35 reviews, with the site's critical consensus reading, "Broad but likeable, 1600 Penn unfortunately doles out its jokes unevenly and lacks the cutting wit necessary to meet its satirical aims." On Metacritic the series has a score of 55 out of 100, based on 36 critics, indicating "mixed or average reviews".

David Hinkley of the New York Daily News gave the series 1 out of 5 stars and said "[it] was clearly designed to be good silly fun. It nails one out of three. It's silly." He called the First Family "annoying... sitcom stereotypes" and said that it "mines none of the more subtle and satisfying possibilities of poking fun at a staid institution. It's more like a drug-fueled Saturday Night Live sketch that won't end. Fortunately, 1600 Penn probably will." Tim Surette of TV.com said that the show is "what happens when network executives think a screeching buffoon equals laughs" and that the jokes elicit responses of "mostly tumbleweeds and cricket chirps". Paste'''s Ross Bonaime also criticized the characters and said, "please, oh please, make the show actually funny... maybe it should just be put out of its misery." Vicki Hyman of The Star-Ledger graded the show a "D" and said, "you'd be forgiven for thinking [it] was a relic of the 1980s or 1990s", adding that the show was looking for "viewers who have lax requirements about actual humor in their comedies." Paul Meekin of Star Pulse noted that the show was unable to escape the footprint of The West Wing and wondered if it was "a years-late West Wing parody, a humorous and fresh take on presidential politics, or somewhere in between?" answering, "it's neither. It's actually quite godawful."

One less critical review came from Hank Stuever of The Washington Post, who called it "formulaic" but said, "give a few points to 1600 Penn for trying." He also noted that "there's no danger of a partisan storyline or any resemblance to the current administration." Maureen Ryan of The Huffington Post called Josh Gad "by far the best thing about this show" and hoped that if the show were cancelled, he find a better vehicle for his talents.

Episodes

Home media
On April 7, 2015, 20th Century Fox Home Entertainment released 1600 Penn - The Complete Series on DVD in Region 1.

See also
 That's My Bush! The First Family''

References

General references

External links
 

2010s American political comedy television series
2010s American single-camera sitcoms
2012 American television series debuts
2013 American television series endings
English-language television shows
NBC original programming
Television series by 20th Century Fox Television
Television series about dysfunctional families
Television shows set in Washington, D.C.
White House in fiction
Teenage pregnancy in television
Television series created by Josh Gad